Farnese may refer to:

People
 House of Farnese, Italian dynasty
 Ranuccio Farnese (1390–1450)
 Pope Paul III, born Alessandro Farnese (1468–1549)
 Alessandro Farnese, Cardinal (1520–1589)
 Giulia Farnese (1474–1524), mistress of Pope Alexander VI and sister of Pope Paul III
 Pier Luigi Farnese, Duke of Parma (1503–1547)
 Ottavio Farnese, second Duke of Parma (1524–1586)
 Ranuccio Farnese, Cardinal (1530–1565)
 Alessandro Farnese, third Duke of Parma (1545–1592)
 Ranuccio I Farnese, fourth Duke of Parma (1569–1622)
 Odoardo Farnese, fifth Duke of Parma (1612–1646)
 Ranuccio II Farnese, sixth Duke of Parma (1630–1694)
 Francesco Farnese, seventh Duke of Parma (1678–1727)
 Antonio Farnese, eighth Duke of Parma (1679–1731)
 Elizabeth Farnese, Queen of Spain, wife of King Philip V, mother of Charles III (1692–1766)
 Larry Farnese (born 1968), American politician from Pennsylvania

Places
 Farnese, Lazio, comune (municipality) in the Province of Viterbo in the Italian region Lazio

Art

 Farnese Bull, massive ancient Hellenistic sculpture, formerly in the Farnese collection in Rome
 Farnese Cup, 2nd-century BC cameo cup of Hellenistic Egypt
 Farnese Hercules, ancient sculpture, formerly in the Farnese collection in Rome

Buildings

Various palazzi and villae built by the Farnese family:

 Palazzo Farnese, prominent High Renaissance palace in Rome, which currently houses the French embassy
 Villa Farnesina, suburban villa in the Via della Lungara, in the Rome district of Trastevere
 Villa Caprarola, villa in the province of Viterbo
 Palazzo Farnese, Piacenza, on the banks of River Ro, residence of the Duke of Piacenza

Other uses
 Farnese Vini-Neri Sottoli, Italian road bicycle racing team